Events from the year 2008 in Antarctica

Events

 January - The British Antarctic Survey (BAS) scientists, led by Hugh Corr and David Vaughan, reported (in the journal Nature Geoscience) that 2,000 years ago, a volcano erupted under Antarctica's ice sheet (based on airborne survey with radar images).
 February 7: A NASA team embarks on a mission to Lake Untersee, searching for extremophiles in its highly alkaline waters.

References